Oyster crackers are small, salted crackers, typically rounds about  in diameter, although a slightly smaller hexagonal variety is also common. The crackers are often served with oyster stew and clam chowder and contain similar ingredients to saltine crackers.

In cuisine
Oyster crackers are popular in the northeastern United States, where they are served as an accompaniment to soup, and in the Cincinnati area, where they are frequently served with that city's distinctive chili. In New England, oyster crackers are served with oyster stew and chowders. Plain oyster crackers are sometimes seasoned with various spices or pepper sauce and served as an appetizer or snack. Oyster crackers have a taste similar to saltine crackers, but usually are less salty. In other areas of the United States, they are among the choices for crackers with soup and are often available in restaurants in single serving packages.

Many different companies produce oyster crackers with different combinations of shortenings and other ingredients, but retaining the same general shape and size.

Etymology 
The origin of the term "oyster cracker" is unclear, but it may be that they were originally served with oyster stew or clam chowder or merely that they look like an oyster in its shell. Other names include "water cracker," "Philadelphia cracker," and "Trenton cracker".

Origins 

The Westminster Cracker Company, currently of Rutland, Vermont, has been making oyster crackers since 1828. However, a counterclaim is that Adam Exton is credited with inventing the oyster cracker.

Adam Exton, a baker in Trenton, New Jersey, immigrated to America from Lancashire, England, in 1842. In Trenton, Exton opened a cake and cracker bakery with his brother-in-law, Richard Aspden, in 1846. Although Aspden died the following year, Exton continued with the bakery (the "Exton Cracker Bakery" or "Adam Exton & Co."). He invented a machine that rolled and docked pastry and solved the sanitary problems of hand-rolling crackers.

The history of the oyster cracker was related by Exton's nephew, also named Adam Exton, in the Trenton Evening Times newspaper on May 31, 1917:

See also 

 Cuisine of Philadelphia
 List of crackers
 Saltine cracker

References 

Crackers (food)
Vermont cuisine
1828 introductions